John H. Broujos (February 12, 1929 – July 8, 2016) was a Democratic member of the Pennsylvania House of Representatives. He served for five terms until his retirement.

Early life and career
Broujos was born in Wilmington, Delaware. He volunteered to serve in the Marine Corps during the Korean War and the Vietnam War. During the Korean War he was awarded the Silver Star, and he ultimately retired from the Corps as a colonel. He later entered law practice.

John A. Maher, a later Republican member of the Pennsylvania House of Representatives, has frequently cited Broujos for inspiring him to be as effective a legislator as possible.

Personal life
He had four children with his wife Louise.

References

Republican Party members of the Pennsylvania House of Representatives
2016 deaths
1929 births